Alistar is a given name and surname. Notable people with the name include:

Alistar Boyd, former Australian rugby union player
Alistar Fredericks, former South African field hockey player
Alistar Jordan (born 1949), former New Zealand cricketer 
Elena Alistar, former politician

See also 
Alistair, a male given name